Markus Knackmuß (born 7 June 1974 in Radolfzell, Baden-Württemberg) is a German football midfielder who last played for FC 08 Villingen. He has also played for Dynamo Dresden, FC Augsburg and SSV Jahn Regensburg.

References

External links

 

1974 births
Living people
People from Radolfzell
Sportspeople from Freiburg (region)
FC Augsburg players
Dynamo Dresden players
SSV Jahn Regensburg players
2. Bundesliga players
SC Pfullendorf players
Association football midfielders
German footballers
Footballers from Baden-Württemberg